Jinx!!!  is a 2013 Japanese romantic comedy film starring T-ara's Park Hyomin, Kento Yamazaki and Kurumi Shimizu. It was the first Japanese film starring a South Korean Idol.

Sypnosis 
Ji-ho is a Korean girl who has lost her boyfriend in an accident. To get over her pain, she decides to travel to Japan as an exchange student at a university. There, she meets Kaede, a shy and lonely girl who doesn't treat her very well at first. Kaede has been in love with Yusuke for a long time, who also feels the same way about her. However, neither of them had the courage to confess. Ji-ho, immediately realizes this and wants to help them, using Korean methods, to achieve her goal of uniting them as a couple.

Cast 

 Park Hyomin as Yoon Ji-ho.
 Kurumi Shimizu as Yamaguchi Kaede.
 Kento Yamazaki as Nomura Yusuke.
 Motoki Ochiai as Matsuzaka Hayato.
 Airi Matsuyama as Muroi Kuniko.
 Jeon Soo Kyung (cameo).
 Sanae Miyata as Mimura Sachie.
 Kazuya Takahashi as Sato Kiyoharu.

Production 
Filming began in mid-February 2013 and was finished mid-March 2013. Shooting took place mostly in Kitakyushu, Fukuoka Prefecture. Part of the movie was filmed in Kyushu International University Library in Kitakyushu City and in South Korea.

Release 
Jinx!!! has its world premiere at the 26th Tokyo International Film Festival on October 20, 2013, making it the first Japanese movie starring a foreign actress to do so. It hit theatres in Japan on November 16, 2013, as a limited release. The film was pre-sold to multiple East Asian countries including South Korea where it premiered on February 13, 2014, under The Dream & Pictures, Hong Kong on February 15, 2014, Singapore and Taiwan.

The film had its European premiere at the 14th Nippon Connection Film Festival in Frankfurt, Germany on May 1, 2014, under the category Nippon Cinema.

In 2015, Jinx!!! was selected as part of the English association "Japan Foundation Touring Film Programme" in its 12th edition and was screened in various cities in the United Kingdom including London at The Institute of Contemporary Arts, Belfast (Northern Ireland), Derby, Birmingham, Nottingham, Kendal and Cumbria.

Home Media and distribution 
Jinx!!! was released as a DVD in Japan on March 14, 2014, under Toei Video in 2 editions; a Regular Edition which included the film, special news and the trailer and first press limited Edition which included 2 DVD sets, the first included the film. the second bonus DVD had behind the scenes videos, interviews with the main cast (Hyomin / Kurumi Shimizu & Kento Yamazaki), Tokyo International Film Festival coverage (October 17 green carpet / November 16 opening stage greeting / November 35 thank you stage greeting), a music video of the original soundtrack Kimi ga Kureta Michishirube (By T-ara), collectibles and a poster.

The film is available for rent and purchase on Yahoo! Japan's online video streaming platform Gayo! under premium content.

Soundtrack 
An original soundtrack was released for the film by South Korean girl group T-ara named Kimi ga Kureta Michishirube (You Gave Me Guidance) on November 20, 2013. The song was released as the group's eighth Japanese single and was then re-released on their third Japanese album Gossip Girls on May 14, 2014.

Awards and nominations

Adaptations 
Yukiko Manabe who was in charge of the screenplay remade the film into a novel on September 25 and into an audio book on February 25, 2014.

The film was also made into a manga by Japanese manga artist Reiko Momochi on November 13, 2013.

References

External links 
Jinx!! profile on Naver.Movie

2013 films
Japanese romantic comedy films